The Bobby Vinton Show was Bobby Vinton's twenty-seventh studio album and his third studio album for ABC Records. It was released in 1975. It features 13 songs that were sung by Vinton on his half-hour variety show of the same name. The album begins with the show's theme song, an instrumental version of Vinton's huge hit "My Melody of Love"; otherwise the remainder of the tracks are cover versions of popular songs of the 1960s and early 1970s. The series was videotaped in Canada, which is where this album was also recorded. The album was produced by Alan Thicke.

Track listing

Side A
 The Bobby Vinton Show Theme ("My Melody of Love" - Instrumental) - (Bobby Vinton, Henry Mayer, Georg Buschor) - 0:24
 "Runaway" - (Del Shannon, Max Crook) - 1:55
 "Killing Me Softly With His Song" - (Norman Gimbel, Charles Fox) - 4:01
 "Build Me Up Buttercup" - (Michael D'Abo, Tony Macaulay) - 1:53
 "Help Me Make It Through the Night" - (Kris Kristofferson) - 2:32
 "Bad Bad Leroy Brown" - (Jim Croce) - 2:32
 "The Way We Were" - (Marvin Hamlisch, Alan Bergman, Marilyn Bergman) - 2:43

Side B
 "Travelin' Band" - (John Fogerty) - 2:10
 "United We Stand" - (Tony Hiller, Peter Simmons) - 2:51
 "(Where Do I Begin) Love Story" - (Francis Lai, Carl Sigman) - 3:39
 "When Will I Be Loved" - (Phil Everly) - 2:01
 "I'm Walkin'" - (Fats Domino, Dave Bartholomew) - 1:37
 "And I Love You So" - (Don McLean) - 3:10

Personnel
Studios: Toronto Sound, Sound Labs, Inc. and ABC Recording Studios, Inc.
Engineers: Terry Brown, John Mills, Howard Gale
Mastering: The Mastering Lab 
Engineer: Mike Reese
Cover photo: Shelley Cohl
Courtesy of Shiral Productions, Ltd.
Executive producers: Alan Blye and Chris Beard
Producer: Alan Thicke
Director: Mike Steele
Musical director: Jimmy Dale

Charts
Album - Billboard (North America)

Bobby Vinton Show (album), The
Bobby Vinton Show (album), The
Bobby Vinton Show (album), The
ABC Records albums